Dalton Emani Makamau Tagelagi (born 5 June 1968) is a Niuean politician and Premier of Niue since June 2020. He was elected premier by the Niue Legislative Assembly on 11 June 2020, defeating O'Love Jacobsen by 13 votes to 7.

Tagelagi is the son of Sam Pata Emani Tagelagi, who served as Speaker of the Niue Legislative Assembly from 1976 to 1993.

Bowls career
He has competed in bowls for Niue, at the 2014 Commonwealth Games in Glasgow and the 2018 Commonwealth Games on the Gold Coast. In 2022, he competed in the men's pairs and the men's fours at the 2022 Commonwealth Games in Birmingham.

Political career
Tagelagi was first elected to the Niue Assembly at the 2008 Niuean general election. Following the 2014 Niuean general election he was appointed Minister of Infrastructure. He was re-elected at the 2017 Niuean general election, and subsequently served as Minister for the Environment, Natural Resources, Agriculture, Forestry and Fisheries. As Environment Minister he represented Niue at the 2019 United Nations Climate Change Conference, calling for rich nations to show greater ambition.

He was re-elected in the 2020 Niuean general election and subsequently elected premier. After being elected he announced that his first priority would be investigating government finances.  As Premier his government ratified the PACER Plus regional trade agreement. During the COVID-19 pandemic he negotiated a one-way travel-bubble allowing Niueans to travel to New Zealand, and oversaw a vaccination program which saw Niue gain full herd immunity to the virus. In November 2021 he began a one-year term as Chancellor of the University of the South Pacific.

References

External links
 
 
 
 

Premiers of Niue
Agriculture ministers of Niue
Environment ministers of Niue
Infrastructure ministers of Niue
Members of the Niue Assembly
1968 births
Living people
People from Alofi
Bowls players at the 2014 Commonwealth Games
Bowls players at the 2018 Commonwealth Games
Bowls players at the 2022 Commonwealth Games
Commonwealth Games competitors for Niue